Herbert Lybrook Hart (February 20, 1897 – May 6, 1988) was an American football and basketball player and coach and college athletics administrator. He served as the head football coach at Mount Morris College from 1922 to 1923, Monmouth College from 1924 to 1928 and 1932 to 1937, and at Humboldt State University from 1938 to 1940.

Hart attended Purdue University, where he played football and basketball and ran track. He later earned a master's degree from the University of Chicago. Hart died on May 6, 1988 at Napa Nursing Center in Napa, California.

Head coaching record

Football

References

External links
 

1897 births
1988 deaths
American football centers
Guards (basketball)
Cal Poly Humboldt Lumberjacks athletic directors
Humboldt State Lumberjacks football coaches
Humboldt State Lumberjacks men's basketball coaches
Monmouth Fighting Scots athletic directors
Monmouth Fighting Scots football coaches
Purdue Boilermakers football players
Purdue Boilermakers men's basketball players
People from Union County, Indiana
Coaches of American football from Indiana
Players of American football from Indiana
Basketball coaches from Indiana
Basketball players from Indiana